Dariusz Pasieka (born 3 August 1965, in Chojnice) is a Polish professional football manager and former player.

References

External links 
 
 

1965 births
Living people
People from Chojnice
Polish footballers
Association football defenders
2. Bundesliga players
Cypriot First Division players
Ekstraklasa players
Zawisza Bydgoszcz players
Nea Salamis Famagusta FC players
Polish expatriate footballers
Expatriate footballers in Cyprus
Dynamo Dresden players
Expatriate footballers in Germany
Polish football managers
SSV Jahn Regensburg managers
Arka Gdynia managers
MKS Cracovia managers
Sportspeople from Pomeranian Voivodeship